The Metropolitan School District of Lawrence Township is a school district in Lawrence Township in northeast Marion County, Indianapolis, Indiana.

It includes two high schools, two middle schools, eleven elementary schools, four kindergarten centers, and one alternative school for at-risk students of middle-school and high-school age. It also operates a Diploma Recovery Program for adults (over 18) and a Community Education Program.

The district includes eight National Blue Ribbon Schools, which have achieve a 97% graduation rate and over 75% progression to post-secondary education.

High schools
 Lawrence North High School
 Lawrence Central High School
McKenzie Center for Innovation & Technology

Middle schools
Belzer Middle School
Fall Creek Valley Middle School

Elementary schools
Amy Beverland Elementary School
Brook Park Elementary School
Crestview Elementary School
Forest Glen Elementary School
Harrison Hill Elementary School
Indian Creek Elementary School
Mary Castle Elementary School
Oaklandon Elementary School
Skiles Test Elementary School
Sunnyside Elementary School
Winding Ridge Elementary School

Early Learning Centers (Kindergarten)
Amy Beverland Early Learning Center
Brook Park Early Learning Center
Mary Castle Early Learning Center
Winding Ridge Early Learning Center

References

Education in Indianapolis
Lawrence Township
School districts established in 1959
1959 establishments in Indiana